Willin' may refer to:
 Willin' (Jon Randall album), an album in 1999 from Jon Randall
 ''Willin''' (Little Feat song), a song of Little Feat, written by lead singer Lowell George in 1970